Clean Sweep is a 1918 silent film comedy short. It was produced by the L-KO Kompany and starred actress Merta Sterling. It was distributed through Universal Film Manufacturing Company.

Cast
Eddie Barry
Chai Hong - Charlie, the Chinese Laundry Man
Merta Sterling - The Lady Barber
Bartine Burkett - The Lady Barber's daughter
Russ Powell - The Butcher (*as Rusell Powell)
Billy Armstrong - Billy

References

External links
A Clean Sweep at IMDb.com
lobby poster

1918 short films
American black-and-white films
American silent short films
Silent American comedy films
1918 comedy films
1918 films
1910s American films